Sulphur Springs is a city in and the county seat of Hopkins County, Texas, United States. As of the 2010 census, its population was 15,449. Sulphur Springs is located along the western edge of Northeast Texas.

History

Sulphur Springs was named so because when the area was first settled, springs of sulfurous water were abundant.

Eli Bib, one of the first European-American settlers, ran a store from his cabin, selling staples, whiskey, persimmon beer, and slabs of ginger cake. In 1849, Dr. and Mrs. Davis moved into the area. Dr. Davis envisioned the spot as a future city. In 1850, the residents organized the area's first church, the Methodist Episcopal. Construction of the church was completed in 1853. In 1852, the Presbyterian Church was organized. At that time, the population of the village was 441. To serve the growing population, commodities began to be brought in from nearby Jefferson. New stores were established.

The village became a city in 1854, when the first post office was established. The city's name was originally "Bright Star".  Mail to and from the city was delivered by the Pony Express. On May 18, 1871, the legislature moved the county seat of Hopkins County from Tarrant to Sulphur Springs, and the name "Bright Star" was removed from the postal directory.

Local government organized slowly. The first known mayor was William A. Wortham. In 1854, Wortham had bought the Texas Star press and moved to Sulphur Springs. His brother-in-law, Bill Davis, and he established the city's first newspaper.

The county seat had numerous newspapers. Echo Publishing Company was founded in 1897. It was the first steam-powered press in Sulphur Springs. After the first plant was lost to a fire, a new plant was constructed that used gasoline as fuel. In 1884, the Sulphur Springs Enterprise was founded. In the same year, James Harvey "Cyclone" Davis, a Populist (People's Party) US congressman, founded the Alliance Vindicator; it was published until 1901. John S. Bagwell bought the Hopkins County Echo in 1916. In 1924, the Texas Star was merged into the Daily News Telegram. The Daily News Telegram later was renamed the Daily Gazette and still later the Weekly Gazette. Eventually, all these newspapers were merged into the Sulphur Springs News-Telegram and the Hopkins County Echo, both of which still operate.

In 1857, the city set aside  of land for Bright Star University. The Sulphur Springs District Conference High School began in 1877, established on Bright Star University land on College Street. In December 1882, the school became known as Central College. It was owned by the Methodist Episcopal Church. It was later renamed Eastman College and Conservatory of Music and Art under a new charter and after the leading professor. Before 1900, the college burned and Professor Eastman left the area.

The First National Bank of Sulphur Springs received its national charter in 1855. It is now known as City National Bank.

In 1857, the area's first steam-powered factory was established by the Bell brothers. In the same year, the Morro Castle was built on North Street. Its builders remain unknown.

C. Denton was elected to lead the new city government, which was incorporated during the Reconstruction Era. During the Civil War, the town had lost its charter and had to be incorporated again by the state legislature.

In 1868, federal troops moved into Sulphur Springs and occupied the city for two years during Reconstruction, in an effort to protect freedmen after emancipation. Upon their departure and the end of the military occupation, A. J. Bridges was elected as mayor.

The construction of a railroad line from Mineola, Texas, in 1872 stimulated growth in the city. Settlers were drawn by tales of the healing powers of the city's sulphur baths. Due to population growth, the springs of sulphur were gradually covered. None is active today. A rail line was run from Jefferson to Sulphur Springs in 1879. The St. Louis, Arkansas & Texas Railroad (Cotton Belt) was built through Sulphur Springs in 1887 on its way to Commerce and Sherman. The next year, the line was completed to Fort Worth, connecting the city to a major market. In 1891, the bankrupt railroad was sold to Jay Gould interests and renamed the St. Louis Southwestern Railway.

An ice plant was built in 1887. The city's courthouse, which is still used today, was constructed in 1895. In 1904, wells were dug to supply the city with water. In the same year, a long-distance telephone line was run to nearby Greenville. In 1889, the City National Bank was organized.

After World War II, the city adopted a new council-manager type of government. It stimulated new programs. Industrialization brought new plants and factories to the city. The population has grown as a result, to an estimate of more than  16,000 in 2016.

The dairy industry was a major component of the local economy from the late 1940s through 1995. The Southwest Dairy Museum in the city features artifacts on the history of the dairy industry. The industry began to shrink largely because of declining milk prices, higher labor costs, and large corporations operating industrial-scale dairies.

Large industries in the area today include Pinnacle, Ocean Spray, Grocery Supply, Jeld-Wen, Clayton Home Mfg., Flowserve, and others. For several months in 2012, Hopkins County enjoyed a very low unemployment rate around 4.5% and over 500 jobs were added.

Sites of interest

 The city public library has two collections; the Leo St. Clair Music Box Collection includes more than 150 music boxes, and the Sinclair World War II Collection displays letters, pictures and other World War II artifacts.  
 The Southwest Dairy Museum and Learning Center depicts all facets of milk production and the history of the dairy industry.
 The Farm and Art Market is located downtown from May through October during the evening. In 2012, American Farmland Trust voted the market "America's Favorite Farmers Market".

Several parks in the city  feature recreational opportunities:
 Coleman Lake and Park is a  park with waterfalls, trails ball parks.
 Buford Park is a one-acre park with castle playground known as Kid's Kingdom. The local walking trail crosses Pea Vine Pinion pond.
 Hopkins County Museum and Heritage Park features  of historical buildings that have been relocated to the park for restoration and preservation.

Lake Fork Reservoir, renowned for champion bass fishing, is 15 miles south of Sulphur Springs.

Geography
Sulphur Springs is at the center of Hopkins County, roughly halfway between Dallas and Texarkana. Interstate 30 passes through the south side of the city, with access from exits 120 through 127. Texas State Highway 19 runs through the western side of Sulphur Springs, leading north  to Paris and southwest  to Canton. Texas State Highway 11 passes through the southern and western sides of Sulphur Springs, leading southeast  to Winnsboro and northwest  to Commerce. Texas State Highway 154 runs through the center of Sulphur Springs as Gilmer Street and Church Street, leading north  to Cooper and south  to Quitman.

The city is part of the Rock Creek (White Oak Creek) watershed, which flows east to the Sulphur River, a tributary of the Red River.

Demographics

As of the 2020 United States census, there were 15,941 people, 6,054 households, and 3,906 families residing in the city. As of the census of 2010, 15,449 people, 5,959 households, and 3,987 families were residing in the city. The population density was 867 people per square mile (314.6/km2). The 6,654 housing units averaged 372.8 per sq mi (140.3/km2). The racial makeup of the city was 68.4% White, 12.6% African American, 0.4% Native American, 0.5% Asian, 0.11% from other races, and 2.1% from two or more races. Hispanics or Latinos of any race were 15.9% of the population.

Of the 5,959 households, 30.0% had children under the age of 18 living with them, 46.1% were married couples living together, 15.5% had a female householder with no husband present, and 33.1% were not families. About 28.4% of all households were made up of individuals, and 11.9% had someone living alone who was 65 years of age or older. The average household size was 2.53, and the average family size was 3.1 people.

In the city, the age distribution was  28.8% under 18, 6.7% from 19 to 24, 25.3% from 25 to 44, 23.8% from 45 to 64, and 15.5% who were 65 or older. The median age was 36.2 years. For every 100 females, there were 92 males. For every 100 females age 18 and over, there were 88 males.

The median income for a household in the city was $42,701, and for a family was $36,802. Males had a median income of $32,022 versus $20,325 for females. The per capita income for the city was $20,967. About 12.6% of families and 16.4% of the population were below the poverty line, including 19.5% of those under age 18 and 14.3% of those age 65 or over.

Transportation

Intercity
Greyhound provides daily service to Dallas and points west, and Texarkana, Arkansas, and all points east, but the city has no bus depot. The Greyhound buses stop at the Pilot truck stop.

Amtrak does not directly serve Sulphur Springs.

Highways
Sulphur Springs is served by these highways that run through the city:

  Interstate 30
  U.S. Highway 67 (runs concurrent with Interstate 30)
  State Highway 11
  State Highway 19
  State Highway 154
  State Loop 301

Airport
The city is served by a municipal airport. It was named Texas Airport of the Year for 2003 by the Federal Aviation Administration.

Railroad
Direct class 1 railroad service is provided by the Kansas City Southern Railroad. Northeast Texas Connector , based in Sulphur Springs, also provides rail access to the town and interchanges with Union Pacific Railroad and Kansas City Southern Railway.

Top employers

Education
The city is served by the Sulphur Springs Independent School District. Sulphur Springs High School has the Wildcats as its sports mascot.  

Sulphur Springs Center Paris Junior College is a postsecondary educational institution located in the city, offering two-year college courses.

Notable people

 Earl Black and Merle Black, political scientists
 Kaci Brown, pop singer
 Samuel Benton Callahan, mixed blood Creek Nation politician, lived in Sulphur Springs before and after the American Civil War
 Sophia Alice Callahan, daughter of Samuel Benton Callahan, noted author of novel, Wynema. Lived in Sulphur Springs during and after the American Civil War
 Jim Chapman, former congressman
 Mandy Clark, birth name Amanda Barney, voice actress
 Keenan Clayton, NFL linebacker
 Steve George, NFL defensive tackle
 Forrest Gregg, SMU football, all Southwest Conference, All-Pro Green Bay Packers, Dallas Cowboys, NFL Coach–Cincinnati Bengals, NFL Hall of Famer
 Tyreo Harrison, NFL linebacker
 Colleen Hoover, New York Times best-selling author
 Damione Lewis, NFL defensive tackle
 Gerald Mann, Texas attorney general and SMU quarterback
 Caleb Miller, NFL linebacker
 Gary Panter, artist, illustrator, musician
 Grover Sellers, Texas attorney general
 Donald W. Washington, former Director of the United States Marshals Service

References

External links

 City of Sulphur Springs official website
 Sulphur Springs Department of Tourism
 Sulphur Springs Independent School District

Cities in Hopkins County, Texas
Cities in Texas
County seats in Texas
Micropolitan areas of Texas